The Alliance Party for Progress (APP) is a Christian and social democratic electoral alliance in Barbados. It was formed on the 30 December 2021 by the United Progressive Party (UPP) and the People's Party for Democracy and Development (PdP) to contest the 2022 Barbadian general election. It is headed by the leader of the PdP Bishop Joseph Atherley with the leader of the UPP Lynette Eastmond becoming deputy head.

History
The United Progressive Party was formed in 2017 and Lynette Eastmond was chosen to lead the new party after much media speculation, concerning the political ambitions of Eastmond herself. That same year after discussions with another new Barbados party called the Citizens Action Partnership, led by Wendell Callender both parties agreed to merge the CAP into the UPP in December 2017. The UPP later contested the 2018 Barbadian general election the next year but only won 1.3 per cent of the vote losing the one seat of Christ Church West, held by new UPP's member, Dr. Agard back to the Barbados Labour Party (BLP).

That same election Joseph Atherley of the BLP won back the St. Michael West seat. On 31 May, less than a week after the swearing-in of the new government, Atherley informed the prime minister of his intention to leave the BLP and become an independent parliamentarian. Due to the absence of other non-BLP MPs in Parliament, Atherley was sworn in the next day as Leader of the Opposition. He later formed the People's Party for Democracy and Development on 9 June 2018 becoming the official opposition party. 

On 27 December 2021, Prime Minister of Barbados Mia Mottley dissolved parliament and called elections for 19 January 2022. The next week, on the 31 December 2021, Atherley and Eastmond announced an electoral alliance between their two parties to contest the 2022 general elections as the APP.

Electoral results & performance

See also 
United Progressive Party
People's Party for Democracy and Development
List of political parties in Barbados

References

Political parties established in 2021
Political parties in Barbados